Vaceuchelus delpretei is a species of sea snail, a marine gastropod mollusk in the family Chilodontidae.

Description
The shell grows to a height of  4 mm. The umbilicate, rather thick, whitish, subvitreous shell has a conic-depressed shape. The apex is obtuse. The first 3 whorls are planate above. They are elegantly ornamented with elevated spiral ribs and longitudinal striae. The first whorl is nearly smooth. The body whorl is double as long as the spire It is tumid, dilated and ornamented with 3 elevated cinguli on the lower part, 2 less elevated ones above. The base of the shell has 6 granulose, minutely striated, concentric cinguli. The thin outer lip is denticulated by the external sulci. The columella is smooth, straight, excavated at its base, and scarcely forming a denticle The white aperture  is oblique and sulcate within.

Distribution
This species occurs in the Red Sea.

References

External links
 Caramagna, G. (1888). Catalogo delle conchiglie Assabesi. Bullettino della Società Malacologica Italiana. 13: 113-149
 Amini-Yekta, F.; Dekker, H. (2021). An updated checklist of marine gastropods of the Persian Gulf and Gulf of Oman. Zootaxa. 4957(1): 1-71

delpretei
Gastropods described in 1888